Elections to the French National Assembly were held Guinea on 10 November 1946, as part of the wider French elections. The territory elected two members to the Assembly. The Socialist and Progressive Union and the Socialist Party won one seat each, taken by Yacine Diallo and Mamba Sano respectively.

Results

References

1946 11
Guinea
1946 in French Guinea
Guinea